The Men's pole vault at the 2014 Commonwealth Games as part of the athletics programme was held at Hampden Park on 1 August 2014.

Records

Results

Jump-off

Final

References

Men's pole vault
2014